"Diana" is a song performed by Bryan Adams. Written by Adams and Jim Vallance, the track appears as the B-side to "Heaven" in some countries, and is one of the most prominent of Bryan Adams' non-album songs. It was released as a single in Portugal.

Background
The song was written in March 1984 in Vancouver, British Columbia, Canada. It was intended as a light, comedic song about the wedding of Charles, Prince of Wales and Lady Diana Spencer. The song was not included on Adams' Reckless album because Adams was worried about offending the royal couple. Nevertheless, the song was later released as a b-side on the single, "Heaven".

Lyrics
The lyrics of the song admire Diana, a celebrity who the narrator first saw in a magazine, then later on TV.  The narrator professes his love for Diana, and indicates that her current husband (never mentioned by name) is not good enough for her. The narrator begs Diana to leave her husband, indicating that she wouldn't have to be part of the "social scene" if she were with him.

Though the song is assumed to be about Diana and Prince Charles, the song never explicitly identifies the characters as such.  Furthermore, it is never mentioned what Diana does (other than being a well-known celebrity), nor is Charles mentioned by name or title.  A royal connection is made, though, in that Diana is identified by the narrator as "the queen of all my dreams".

Media reaction
According to co-writer Jim Vallance, when the British press obtained a copy of the record, they "attempted to fabricate a scandal" by saying that Adams had inappropriate feelings for Diana and had insulted Prince Charles.

Live performance
Adams is said to have had an affair with Diana while dating Cecilie Thomsen, but this was ten years after writing the song. Adams often performed the song during his live concerts up until the day of Diana's death after which he retired the song permanently.

See also
Reckless
Diana, Princess of Wales

References

Bryan Adams songs
1985 songs
Songs written by Jim Vallance
Songs written by Bryan Adams
Song recordings produced by Bob Clearmountain
Cultural depictions of Diana, Princess of Wales